Enes Küç (born 28 November 1996) is a German-Turkish footballer who plays as a midfielder for Viktoria Berlin.

References

External links
 Profile at DFB.de
 Profile at kicker.de
 

1996 births
Living people
German footballers
Turkish footballers
German people of Turkish descent
Association football midfielders
VfL Bochum II players
Hamburger SV II players
Berliner AK 07 players
Würzburger Kickers players
FC Viktoria 1889 Berlin players
3. Liga players
Regionalliga players